Pointe-Claire was a former provincial electoral district in the Montreal region of Quebec, Canada that elected members to the National Assembly of Quebec.

It was created for the 1973 election, from parts of the existing Jacques-Cartier and Robert-Baldwin electoral districts.  Its final election was in 1976.  It disappeared in the 1981 election and its successor electoral district was Nelligan.

Members of the National Assembly

Electoral results

External links
Election results
 Election results (National Assembly)
 Election results (Quebecpolitique.com)

Former provincial electoral districts of Quebec